The GCC Champions League, formerly known as the Gulf Cup for Clubs, was an annually organized football league tournament for clubs of the Arabian peninsula.  The tournament was first organized in 1982 and was last played in 2015, the 31st edition. Attempts to play the 2016 and 2017 editions failed.

It was organised by the Gulf Cooperation Council and open to clubs from Bahrain, Kuwait, Oman, Qatar, Saudi Arabia, and the United Arab Emirates.

Although having much popularity in its initial first decades, the tournament faced decline as the Asian Champions League and AFC Cup forced many Gulf clubs to be unable to participate in the competition.

Logos

Winners of GCC Champions League

Performances

Performance by nation
The following table lists countries by number of winners and runners-up in GCC Champions League.
Saudi Arabia is the current leader by nation with 13 titles.

Performance by club
The following table lists clubs by the number of winners and runners-up in the Cup.

References

External links
 GCC Champions League at RSSSF
 GCC Champions League - Hailoosport.com 
 GCC Champions League at Hailoosport

 

 
Union of Arab Football Associations club competitions
Gulf Cooperation Council